Charles Malato (1857–1938) was a French anarchist and writer.

He was born to a noble Neapolitan family, his grandfather Count Malato being a Field Marshal and the Commander-in-Chief of the army of the last King of Naples. Though Count Malato ferociously suppressed a popular anti-dynastic insurrection, his son – Charles' father – supported the communards of the Paris Commune, and was banished as a result to the penal colony of New Caledonia, where Charles was born. After the amnesty of anarchists and communists, Charles and his by that time ninety-year-old father returned to Paris, where they immersed themselves in the anarchist movement.

On his return to France, Malato was condemned to fifteen months in prison for inciting murder, pillage and arson, and instead went into exile in London. Malato collaborated briefly with Victor Henri Rochefort, Marquis de Rochefort-Luçay before they fell out over the Dreyfus affair (Rochefort was an anti-Dreyfusard). He wrote for Georges Clemenceau's L'Aurore, L'Humanité, and the Journal du peuple (with Sébastien Faure) and partook in a revolutionary committee against nationalist activities. According to The New York Times Malato wrote articles "remarkable for their literary grace", was well known in political and literary circles, and "noted for the perfection of his manners".

He was accused by French police in 1905 of organising an assassination attempt against King Alfonso XIII of Spain, but was acquitted. Between 1907 and 1914, Malato wrote in the journals La Guerre Sociale and La Bataille Syndicaliste, and became friends with the anarchist educator Francisco Ferrer.

At the outset of World War I, Malato was a supporter of the union sacrée and a signatory of the pro-Allies Manifesto of the Sixteen.

Publications 
 Joyeusetés de l’exil
 La Grande Grève
 "Le Nouveau Faust" Edité à Barcelone 'La Esculela Moderna' 1919, a philosophical-fantastical drama with illustrations by Robert Louis Antral. A volume in-12 of 78 pp., cover illustrated in colour.

Notes

1857 births
1938 deaths
French anarchists
Anarchist theorists
French male writers